Elizabeth Smylie and Linda Wild were the defending champions but only Wild competed that year with Nathalie Tauziat.

Tauziat and Wild lost in the final 6–2, 6–3 against Katrina Adams and Larisa Savchenko.

Seeds
Champion seeds are indicated in bold text while text in italics indicates the round in which those seeds were eliminated. The top four seeded teams received byes into the second round.

Draw

Finals

Top half

Bottom half

Qualifying draw

External links
 1997 DFS Classic Draws
 ITF Tournament Page
 ITF doubles results page
 ITF doubles qualifying results page

Birmingham Classic (tennis)
1997 WTA Tour